Santorini caldera is a large, mostly submerged caldera, located in the southern Aegean Sea, 120 kilometers north of Crete in Greece. Visible above water is the circular Santorini island group, consisting of Santorini (classic Greek Thera), the main island, Therasia and Aspronisi at the periphery, and the Kameni islands at the center. It has been designated a Decade Volcano.

Geography

There are two small volcanic islands at the center of the caldera, Nea ("New") Kameni and Palea ("Old") Kameni.

Santorini's high walls, draped by whitewashed villages, combined with a sunny climate and good observation conditions, have made it a magnet for volcanologists, as well as a highlight of tourism in the Aegean.

Geology

The volcanic complex of Santorini is the most active part of the South Aegean Volcanic Arc, which includes the active volcanoes of Methana on the mainland of Greece, Milos, Santorini and Nisyros. It is formed by the subduction of the African tectonic plate underneath the Aegean subplate of the Eurasian tectonic plate, which occurs at a rate of up to 5 cm per year in a northeasterly direction.  This subduction causes earthquakes at depths of 150–170 km.

Non-volcanic rocks are exposed on Santorini at Mikro Profititis Ilias, Mesa Vouno, the Gavrillos ridge, Pirgos, Monolithos and the inner side of the caldera wall between Cape Plaka and Athinios.

The Kameni islands at the center of the caldera are made of lava rocks.

Volcanology

The caldera of Santorini lies in the center of the Christiana-Santorini-Kolumbo volcanic field, which comprises the extinct  Christiana Volcano, the Santorini Caldera, the polygenetic submarine Kolumbo Volcano, as well as the Kolumbo Volcanic Chain.  This volcanic lineament evolved during four main phases of volcanic activity, which initiated in the Pliocene from several local centers that only recently matured to form the vast Santorini edifice. The present-day caldera is composed of overlapping shield volcanoes, cut by at least four partially overlapping calderas, of which the oldest southern caldera was formed about 180,000 years before the present era (BP). The subsequent Skaros caldera was created about 70,000 years BP, and the Cape Riva caldera about 21,000 years BP. The current caldera was formed about 3600 years BP during the Minoan eruption.

Palea Kameni and Nea Kameni were formed as a result of multiple, initially submarine, smaller eruptions at the center of the caldera.

Although dormant, Santorini is an active volcano.  Numerous minor and medium-sized, mainly effusive, eruptions have built the dark-colored lava shields of Nea and Palea Kameni inside the caldera.

Their last eruption was in 1950, and now only fumarolic activity, primarily inside the recently active craters, takes place. GPS instruments registered renewed deformation around the caldera in 2011 and 2012.

The huge Minoan eruption of Santorini in the 17th century BC may have inspired the legend of Atlantis. It was rated 7 in the Smithsonian Global Volcanism Program's Volcanic Explosivity Index.

Eruptive history
Following is a list of the major eruptive events of Santorini beginning with the catastrophic Minoan eruption, as noted by the Smithsonian National Museum of Natural History's Global Volcanism Program:

IUGS geological heritage site
In respect of it being 'one of the largest calderas in the Mediterranean Sea formed by Plinian eruptions in a volcanic arc tectonic framework', the International Union of Geological Sciences (IUGS) included 'The Quaternary Santorini Caldera' in its assemblage of 100 'geological heritage sites' around the world in a listing published in October 2022. The organisation defines an IUGS Geological Heritage Site as 'a key place with geological elements and/or processes of international scientific relevance, used as a reference, and/or with a substantial contribution to the development of geological sciences through history.'

References

Aegean Sea
Calderas of Greece
Landforms of the South Aegean
Landforms of Thira (regional unit)
Santorini
Submarine calderas
VEI-7 volcanoes
Volcanoes of Greece
First 100 IUGS Geological Heritage Sites